Jan Hernych and Ivo Minář were the defending champions, but Hernych chose not to compete this year and Minář chose to compete in Palm Hills instead. Oliver Marach and Santiago Ventura won in the final 5–7, 6–3, [16–14], against Eric Butorac and Michael Kohlmann.

Seeds

Draw

Draw

References
 Doubles Draw

Bmw Open - Doubles
2010 BMW Open